Imperial Triumphant is an American experimental metal band formed in 2005 in New York City.

History 
Imperial Triumphant was formed in 2005 by Zachary Ilya Ezrin in New York City. Their first album, Abominamentvm, was released in 2012. Imperial Triumphant's second album, Abyssal Gods, was released in 2015. Described by No Clean Singing's Austin Weber, "Abyssal Gods, is overall a thoroughly vicious act of blasphemy packed with more memorable moments than many bands accumulate in a lifetime of albums". Commenting on the band's effort to date as a whole, Weber stated "Imperial Triumphant are not only one of the most important U.S. black metal acts currently active, truly carving their own stylistic path, but they are also important to the future of black metal."

Following the second album, in March 2016, Imperial Triumphant released Inceste. A review in Decibel magazine commented that "Imperial Triumphant obviously have no use for the genre game... Inceste continues to warp expectations".

Following the release of the studio album Vile Luxury, Imperial Triumphant embarked on their first European tour in April 2019, including a show at Roadburn Festival. This was followed by further European dates in November 2019, including headlining the 'Cult Never Dies Stage' at Damnation Festival in Leeds, UK.

In October 2019, it was announced that Imperial Triumphant had signed to Century Media Records and plan to release new material in 2020. Subsequent Instagram posts from the band confirmed they had begun tracking at Colin Marston's Menegroth Studios in New York on December 10, 2019.

Imperial Triumphant were one of the many bands whose touring plans were affected by the COVID-19 pandemic, postponing the 'Devastation on the Nation' tour until 2021.

In April 2020, Imperial Triumphant announced via Instagram that the new album would be entitled Alphaville and would be released July 21, 2020. Alongside this announcement a documentary video was released via Metal Injection detailing behind-the-scenes work on Alphaville and guest musicians who had collaborated, amongst them Tomas Haake of Meshuggah, longtime collaborator Colin Marston, and Trey Spruance of Mr. Bungle. Metal Hammer named Alphaville as the 10th best metal album of 2020.

In May 2022, Imperial Triumphant announced their album 'Spirit of Ecstasy' with the release of the music video for the track 'Maximalist Scream'. This was followed up with a release of the song 'Merkurius Gilded' with accompanying music video in June, featuring guest guitars from former bandmate Max Gorelick, and Kenny G on soprano saxophone. 'Spirit of Ecstasy' was released on 22nd of July 2022.

Musical style 
Imperial Triumphant's musical style has changed since formation in 2005 to encompass musical and lyrical influence from their home city of New York. Commenting on the release of Vile Luxury in 2018, Ezrin described the record as "our most refined and metropolitan release to date", commenting further that the band had taken "the New York City influence that shaped the world, embraced the aspect of our sonic pyramid that at its core comes from jazz, and applied it to black metal".

Band members 
Current members
 Zachary Ilya Ezrin – vocals, guitars (2005–present)
 Kenny Grohowski – drums (2012–present)
 Steve Blanco – bass, vocals, keyboards (2014–present)

Previous members
 Naargryl Fjellkrieger – bass, backing vocals (2005–2012)
 Amarok Myrvandr – cello, guitars, violin (2005–2012)
 Maelström – drums (2005–2008)
 Alex Cohen – drums (2008)
 Erik Malave – bass (2012–2015)
 Max Gorelick – guitars (2016)

Discography 
Studio Albums
 Abominamentvm (2012)
 Abyssal Gods (2015)
 Vile Luxury (2018)
 Alphaville (2020)
 Spirit of Ecstasy (2022)

EPs
 Obeisance (2010)
 Goliath (2013)
 Inceste (2016)

Singles
 Manifesto (2012)

Compilations
 Shrine to the Trident Throne (2014)

References

External links 
Official Website
Imperial Triumphant at Bandcamp
Imperial Triumphant at Facebook
Imperial Triumphant at Instagram

Musical groups from New York City
Musical groups established in 2005
American avant-garde metal musical groups
American black metal musical groups
Century Media Records artists